Old man's beard (Clematis vitalba) is an invasive plant in New Zealand that affects indigenous biodiversity. It is declared an unwanted organism under the Biosecurity Act 1993 which means it cannot be sold, distributed or propagated.

Spread
Old man's beard was introduced into New Zealand as an ornamental plant some time before 1922 and the Department of Conservation and other government organisations now spend millions of dollars on its control.
The seeds are wind-borne on a fluffy boll and can remain on the vine over the winter months. The seeds are most likely to germinate on disturbed ground where the light level is more than 5% of  full sunlight. It is more common outside undisturbed forests on forest and stream margins and forest gaps.

Impact
Old man's beard is a climber that will smother established trees and forms a dense canopy that stops sunlight reaching the soil surface. This affects the health of the existing vegetation and prevents the germination of all other species.

Control
Various methods are used to control the plant including mechanical removal, herbicides and biological control. Large vines can be cut at ground level and a herbicide gel applied to prevent sprouting. Trailing vines must be removed since they can re-sprout, and small plants can be uprooted. Biological control agents have been trialled.

A public service campaign highlighting the threat of old man's beard was carried out by the Department of Conservation in the 1980s using the British naturalist David Bellamy as the spokesperson.

See also
Invasive species in New Zealand
Biodiversity of New Zealand
Gardening in New Zealand

References

Further reading
Atkinson. I.A.E., (1984). Distribution and potential range of old man's beard, Clematis vitalba, in New Zealand. In: The Clematis vitalba threat pp. 6–24. Information series 11, NZ Dept. of Lands and Survey, Wellington.

West, C.J. (1992). Ecological studies of Clematis vitalba (old man's beard) in New Zealand. Dept. of Scientific and Industrial Research, Land Resources Vegetation Report No. 736, DSIR, Wellington.

External links

Old man's beard entry on the National Pest Plant Accord
Old man's beard at the Royal New Zealand Institute of Horticulture 
Old man's beard & New Zealand clematis at the Christchurch City Council
Clematis vitalba at the Global Invasive Species Database
"Old man's beard must go" - a public service announcement fronted by David Bellamy

Regional Council information
Auckland
Bay of Plenty
Canterbury
Otago
Waikato

Invasive plant species in New Zealand